Lucky Pangabantu (born 8 April 1981) is a South African former cricketer. He played in 81 first-class, 57 List A, and 14 Twenty20 matches for Border from 2004 to 2016.

See also
 List of Border representative cricketers

References

External links
 

1981 births
Living people
South African cricketers
Border cricketers
Sportspeople from Qonce